Giacomo Cattani (Brisighella, 13 January 1823 - Ravenna, 14 February 1887) was an Italian Catholic Cardinal and Archbishop.

He was born on 13 January 1823, in Brisighella.

Pope Leo XIII elevated him to the rank of cardinal in the consistory of 19 September 1879. He was Titular Archbishop of Ancyra, Apostolic Nuncio to Belgium, Secretary of the Congregation of the Council, Apostolic Nuncio to Spain, Archbishop of Ravenna, Italy, and Cardinal-Priest of Santa Balbina.

He died on 14 February 1887, in Ravenna.

References

1823 births
1887 deaths
19th-century Italian cardinals
19th-century Italian Roman Catholic archbishops
Cardinals created by Pope Leo XIII

Apostolic Nuncios to Spain